Richard H. Blake (born May 17, 1975 as Richard Harrison Thomas) is an American actor and singer best known for his work in musical theatre.

Blake made his Broadway debut in Teddy & Alice, starring Len Cariou at the Minskoff Theatre in 1987. The following year he appeared as Boy McDuff in Macbeth, starring Christopher Plummer and Glenda Jackson, on Broadway at the Mark Hellinger Theatre.

Blake then starred as the title character in the 1989 Broadway musical Prince of Central Park, becoming (at 14) the youngest Broadway performer to have his name above the title of the show. However, the show closed after only 4 performances.

In 1990, he appeared on Star Search, beating future Tony-winner Sutton Foster.

Back on Broadway, he took over the role of Roger Davis in Rent and originated the role of Gus in the 1999 musical Saturday Night Fever; he also joined the national tour as Tony Manero. He also took over the role Link Larkin in the Broadway production of Hairspray.

Blake originated the role of Glen Guglia in the 2006 Broadway version of The Wedding Singer at the Al Hirschfeld Theatre. He then starred in the Legally Blonde musical at the Palace Theatre, originating the role of Warner Huntington III alongside Laura Bell Bundy and Christian Borle. He can be heard on both The Wedding Singer and Legally Blonde cast recordings.

Blake had a lengthy run as Fiyero on the First National tour of Wicked after replacing Cliffton Hall on November 18, 2008. He toured North America with the show until February 13, 2011. He then replaced Kyle Dean Massey as Fiyero on Broadway beginning March 29, 2011. He exited the Broadway company on July 29, 2012, and was replaced by Massey. Blake subsequently joined his third production of Wicked, this time in Asia, replacing David Harris as Fiyero beginning August 7 in Seoul, South Korea.

After leaving Wicked, Blake joined the Broadway cast of Matilda the Musical in the roles of the Escapologist, Sergei, and the Party Entertainer. He then took over the role of Tommy DeVito in the Broadway production of Jersey Boys beginning January 9, 2014.

Blake starred as Lorenzo in the musical adaptation of A Bronx Tale on Broadway at the Longacre Theatre. The musical opened officially on December 1, 2016 and closed on August 5, 2018.

References

External links 
 
 Richard H. Blake at Broadway.com
 BroadwayWorld.com interview with Richard H. Blake, August 28, 2007

1975 births
Living people
American male musical theatre actors
Actors from Providence, Rhode Island
Place of birth missing (living people)
Male actors from Rhode Island